Ramón Meza y Suárez Inclán (January 28, 1861 – 1911), was a Cuban literary critic, historian, professor and Doctor in Philosophy and Literature at the University of Havana, and also author of many works of both fiction and non-fiction.

Life

When he was 17 years of age, he enrolled in the University of Havana, where he majored in 1882 in Civil Law.

Two years later, his first literary reviews were published. He contributed extensively to the periodicals La lotería, to Revista de Cuba, and Cuba en América.

On July 7, 1900, he was appointed Subsecretary of Justice, filling in the position for Alfredo Zayas y Alfonso.

A month later, on August 17, 1900, he resigned the position to which he had been appointed, and was replaced by Gastón Mora y Varona.

In 1900, he wrote an article for the faculty at the University of Havana titled Don Quijote como tipo ideal, in which he paid tribute to Cervante's masterpiece Don Quijote de la Mancha.

Published works

References

Other materials to consult

External links
 

Cuban male writers
Cuban politicians
20th-century Cuban historians
1911 deaths
1861 births
Writers from Havana
19th-century Cuban historians